Morąg is a town in northern Poland in Ostróda County in the Warmian-Masurian Voivodeship. It is the seat of Gmina Morąg (commune).

Geography
The town is situated in the western uplands of the historic Prussia region. The nearest city is Olsztyn in Warmia,  to the southeast.

History

Middle Ages

In medieval times, an Old Prussian settlement existed at the site under the name of Mawrin, Maurin or Morin. A new town was built on its place by the invading Teutonic Knights after they destroyed the original settlement in the late 13th century. Part of the Order's State, it was given the name Mohrungen after a nearby lake and in 1327 attained Kulm town law from the local commander (Komtur) Hermann von Oettingen. The first inhabitants of the town were emigrants from the southern Harz region in central Germany.

After the 1410 Battle of Grunwald the victorious Polish-Lithuanian army took over the town and the castle without a fight. During the Polish–Teutonic Hunger War of 1414, Mohrungen incinerated completely. In 1440, the town joined the anti-Teutonic Prussian Confederation, at the request of which King Casimir IV Jagiellon signed the act of incorporation of the region to the Kingdom of Poland in 1454. At the start of the subsequent Thirteen Years' War, the citizens sided with Poland, and on June 11, 1454 in Elbing (Elbląg), the town pledged allegiance to the Polish King. The town fought against the Teutonic Order in the war from 1454 to 1466. Reconquered by the Elbing commander Heinrich Reuß von Plauen in 1461, the town became his seat as deputy Grand Master. The command of the town was given to Ertman von Kirchberg, who oppressed the inhabitants. After the peace treaty signed in Toruń in 1466, the town became a part of Poland as a fief held by the Teutonic Knights.

Mohrungen was on a shipping commerce line connecting Truso with harbors at the Black Sea. Agriculture and commerce was the primary occupations in the town. It was known as a cattle and grain market.

Modern era

During the Polish–Teutonic War of 1519–21, Morąg was again captured by Poland in 1520, after the local commander, Czech mercenary Wurgel Drahnicky, who wanted to defend the castle, was forced to submit to the Poles by the townspeople and his own troops. Upon the Protestant Reformation and the secularisation of the Order's State in 1525 it became part of Ducal Prussia, remaining a Polish fief until 1657. The estates were held by Colonel Peter von Dohna (1483–1553), Lord of Schlobitten, whose son Achatius von Dohna (1533–1619) had a castle erected. Peter's grandson Christopher von Dohna (1583–1637) became known as a scholar and governor of the Principality of Orange during the Thirty Years' War. Rebuilt in a Baroque style in the early 18th century, Dohna Palace is today used as a museum.

Mohrungen was again devastated during the Polish–Swedish War in 1626. From 1701 it was part of the Kingdom of Prussia under King Frederick I. It remained the seat of the local administration, since 1752 of Landkreis Mohrungen (Morąg district). Despite being outside of Polish suzerainty since 1657, in the 18th century Poles still inhabited the town and its surroundings, and the town owed its prosperity to trade routes connecting with Poland. The town was within short distances surrounded by Polish territory. During the Napoleonic War of the Fourth Coalition, in 1807, Marshal Jean-Baptiste Jules Bernadotte, the future King of Sweden and Norway, took his residence at Dohna Palace; his French forces defeated the advance guard of Levin von Bennigsen's Russian Army at the Battle of Mohrungen on January 25, 1807. An earthquake struck the town in 1818.

The town received access to the Prussian state railways network in 1882. Part of the East Prussian Königsberg region, Mohrungen between 1871 and 1945 belonged to Germany. During World War II, some expelled Poles from Mazovia were enslaved by the Germans as forced labour in the town's vicinity. It was occupied by Soviet Red Army forces of the 2nd Belorussian Front during the East Prussian Offensive on 23 January 1945. After World War II, the remaining local populace was expelled and the town became part of the re-established Polish Republic according to the Potsdam Agreement, given its historic Polish name Morąg. A garrison of the Polish Army was located in the town.

From May 2010 to 2011 the town was the garrison of a United States Army Patriot Missile Defense battery.

Sights 

After a fire in 1697 only Dohna Palace and the parish church, which was restored and rebuilt several times, survived. Following World War II in 1945 fires burnt about 45% of the historic town centre. Only the outer walls of the town hall remained.

The old castle of the Teutonic Knights is being excavated as more of it has been recently discovered.
The Dohna Palace, which was mostly destroyed in the Second World War, was restored in 1986. Now it houses the Museum of Johann Gottfried Herder, an impressive regional museum.
The main body of the Catholic church of Saint Peter and Saint Paul goes back to the first half of the 14th century.
The town hall, damaged in the Second World War, was rebuilt from 1947-1954 as it looked before.
Some ruins of the original town walls still remain.
Kretowiny, a popular lake and camp ground are only 9 km away and are a favorite and frequent retreat for the local population.

Population 
1740: 1,067
1782: 1,753
1820: 2,108
1856: 3,407
1880: 3,633
1885: 3,922
1890: 3,780
1900: 4,025
1910: 4,147
1925: 4,934
1933: 5,414
2003: 14,570
2010: 13,895
2017: 14,042

Transport
Voivodeship roads 519 ( Stary Dzierzgoń, Zalewo, Małdyty, Morąg ), 527 ( Dzierzgoń, Pasłęk, Morąg, Olsztyn ) and 528 ( Morąg, Miłakowo, Orneta ) pass through the town. There are two train stations in Morąg, and the Polish State Railways (PKP) provide connections with major Polish cities, such as Gdańsk, Gdynia, Szczecin, Białystok, Elbląg and Olsztyn. In the past, there was a railway connection with Ostróda through Miłomłyn (opened in 1909, passenger trains cancelled in 1992, cargo trains cancelled in 1994, rail line demolished in 2006) and to Orneta through Miłakowo ( opened in 1894, demolished in 1945, cancelling any train traffic ).

Sports
It competes in the lower leagues.

Famous residents 
Christoph von Dohna (1583–1637), German politician
Abraham Calovius (1612–1686), Lutheran theologian
Johann Gottfried von Herder (1744–1803), German author, Lutheran theologian, and eminent enlightenment philosopher
Gustav Hermann Schmischke (1883-unknown), Gauleiter 
Elisabeth von Thadden (1890–1944), German educator
Alfred Jaedtke (1913–1992), Wehrmacht officer 
Gerhard Bondzin (born 1930), German painter - Gallery
Bernd Heine (born 1939), German linguist
Zbigniew Nienacki (1929–1994), Polish writer

Religion
Pastoral activity in the town is the Roman Catholic Church and the Pentecostal Church - Protestant community on the nature of the Gospel, as well as the Greek Orthodox Church.

References

External links 
 Municipal website 

1302 establishments in Europe
Castles of the Teutonic Knights
Cities and towns in Warmian-Masurian Voivodeship
Ostróda County
Populated places established in the 1300s
14th-century establishments in Poland